The Football Federation of Macedonia (FFM) or Football Federation of  Macedonia is the governing body of football in North Macedonia based in Skopje.

History
FFM was officially formed after the establishment of then SR Macedonia as part of SFR Yugoslavia, following World War II on 14 August 1949 in Skopje (after the end of World War II, the first football department was established as a part of the sport association of the city of Skopje, the football section was separated on 16 August 1948). From 1949 to 2002, it was called the Football Association of Macedonia ( / Fudbalski Sojuz na Makedonija or ФСМ/FSM). The first ever president was Ljubisav Ivanov - Dzingo.Andon Dončevski was appointed by FFM as the first ever coach of the North Macedonia national team.

Crest

Macedonian flag on top behind a yellow background. Below, a blue crest with the yellow FFM Cyrillic letters above a football.

On 22 March 2014, the FFM launched a new crest.

Operations
It operates these codes:
First Macedonian Football League
Second Macedonian Football League
Third Macedonian Football League
Macedonian Regional Leagues
Macedonian Football Cup
Macedonian Football Super Cup
Macedonian women's football championship
Macedonian Women's Football Cup
North Macedonia national football team
North Macedonia national under-21 football team
North Macedonia national under-19 football team
North Macedonia national under-17 football team
North Macedonia women's national football team
North Macedonia national futsal team

Staff

Presidents

References

External links
Official Website 
 North Macedonia at UEFA.com
North Macedonia at FIFA.com

North Macedonia
Football in North Macedonia
Futsal in North Macedonia
Football
Sports organizations established in 1948
1948 establishments in Yugoslavia